The discography of American rapper MadeinTYO consists of a studio album, three mixtapes, two EPs and nine singles.

Albums

Mixtapes

EPs

Singles

As lead artist

As featured artist

Other charted and certified songs

Guest appearances

Notes

References 

Hip hop discographies
Discographies of American artists